The Philippine Science High School - Main Campus is the flagship campus of the Philippine Science High School System. It was founded in 1964. It is located in Agham Road, Diliman, Quezon City.

The Campus
The 7.5 hectare campus includes two main buildings, the Science and Humanities Building (SHB), and the Advanced Science and Technology Building (ASTB). As of school year 2016–2017, a constructed extension of the SHB (SHBEx) has been available to the use of the students and faculty. Majority of the classes are held and majority of the faculty units, namely the Biology, Chemistry, Integrated Science, Math, and Humanities Units, have their offices in the Science and Humanities Building. The Curriculum Instructions and Services Division (CISD) Office, Student Services Division (SSD) Office, Office of the Registrar, Office of the Director, and the school library are all located on the second floor of the same building.

The Computer Science Unit, Art Design Technology Unit, Physics Unit and the Management Information System (MIS) are located in the Advanced Science and Technology Building. Classes in Computer Science I-IV, Technology Preparation, Biology II, and Physics III-IV are usually held in this building. Sophomore, junior, and senior electives such as Advanced Chemistry, Life Science, Problem-Based Physics, and Embedded Systems are likewise held in this building.

The campus also includes four dormitories: three for boys and one for girls. The boys' and girls' dormitories are subdivided in turn by class (one for first- and second-year students, one for third- and fourth-year students).

Recreational facilities on campus include a multipurpose gymnasium, supplying bowling lanes, pingpong tables, a dance room, basketball court and an Olympic-sized swimming pool. Outside the gym a football field, concessionaires, track oval, and volleyball, tennis, and another basketball court may also be found.

Classes

Admissions
To be admitted to the PSHS System, a prospective student must pass the PSHS National Competitive Exam. In order to take the exam, the student must belong to the top 10% of the graduating class. Around 20,000 applications are received each year.  The top 240 students of the exam are guaranteed slots in the Main Campus. In case a student doesn't want to enter the school or wants to transfer to another campus, students from the waiting list are called up to be enrolled in the Main Campus in order to complete the 240 slots allotted by the system. They are then divided into eight sections with 30 students or less in each section. After the first year of the batch, slots emptied by dismissed students or those who choose to transfer are then filled by new students who qualify via a placement exam given to students who belong to the top percentage of their batch in another school. However, currently only up to Grade 9 students are allowed to be transferees. Afterwards, the remaining students are the only ones left who can graduate at the Main Campus.

Students from the Main Campus may transfer to other campuses. Students from the regional campuses may apply for transfer to the Main Campus. However, they must meet a grade requirement. Students outside the Philippine Science High School System may also apply for transfer to the Main Campus. However, they must take a lateral exam and must meet a grade requirement.

Sections
The Main Campus has around 30 students in each class, with 8 classes per batch, in a total of about 240 students in each year level. The names of the sections in each year level are in accordance to a theme based on the major subject offered in that particular year level in the former 4-year curriculum. (Earth Science for Grade 7, Biology for Grade 8, Chemistry for Grade 9, and Physics for Grade 10.) In the new 6-year curriculum, sections of Grades 11-12 are both assigned the first 8 letters of the alphabet and are called blocks.

Streaming
Streaming to Technology and Science streams began in June 1995. Only 2 sections out of the 8 in each 'batch' were chosen to be in the Technology stream.

Prior to 2005, incoming freshmen batches were required to take a streaming exam to determine their mathematics and sciences aptitude. Those who had rather high scores were put into the so-called "Technology Stream" and had a set curriculum that includes drafting and technology research. The "Science Stream" had art and earth science classes in the first and second years and had more leeway in choosing their electives, which include English and Filipino journalism, microbiology, microprocessing, and visual communications.

Starting from Batch 2009, streaming was abolished. Instead of having 90 students taking technology electives during the second year, based on the student's first year performance and desired stream, every student has a fair chance of experiencing both the science and technology stream.

Curriculum
Students undergo through a curriculum which emphasizes the sciences and mathematics. During Grades 7–9, the students all have a unified core curriculum with a heavier load to their math and science subjects. For Grade 10, the same is true but they get to choose one elective subject. For the Specialization Years Program (SYP) or Grades 11–12, they get to choose a core and elective science, along with their research and humanities subjects.

Student life

Organizations
Students may join a variety of co-curricular organizations, such as the Student Council (SC), AKSIS (Social Sciences Club), Concern and Action for the Rehabilitation of the Environment (CARE), Physics Youth Honours Society (PYHS), Mathematics Club, Astronomical Society (ASTROSOC), Invictus (Debate Club), SARS+ (Society for the Advancement of Research in Science and Technology) and the Atom Family (Chemistry Club).

Likewise, extra-curricular associations are present in PSHS. These include the Science Scholar and Ang Lagablab (English and Filipino student publications, respectively); theater groups such as Sightlines and Kamalayan, and dance groups such as SAGALA (Sayaw Galaw); the Himig Agham choral club; and the Samahan ng Manunugtog sa Pisay (SAMAPI), which annually holds concerts during the School Fair; Bravura, the classical music club; Balamesa, the board games club; Computron the computer science club under which is Likha, the digital media interest group; Pisay.XYZ, the maker club; Exposure, the photography club; Alianti, the Ultimate frisbee club, Labuyo, the boys’ soccer club; LAAB, the girls’ soccer club; Flux, the swim club; Silakbo, the girls' basketball club; Pallastro, the boys' basketball club; Kislap, the volleyball club; Alyabo, the arnis club; Kaizen the fighting game club;,  and Volant, the badminton club.

Athletics

Contrary to the common perception that PSHS students are too preoccupied with studies to even engage in sports, a culture of athletic competition pervades the campus. The basketball and volleyball teams have had limited success owing to the lack of tall students entering the school, but have also produced athletes who have been successful at the college intramural levels. PSHS has also produced athletes in other sports (such as track and field, streetdance, and chess) who have participated in the collegiate athletic leagues such as the UAAP.

The school also holds intramural events for major sports, while the dormitories sponsor basketball leagues.

YMSAT and Humanities Week
The school holds a Youth Math Science and Technology (YMSAT) Week annually, typically during the 1st or 2nd week of March. During this week, special science projects are presented by various year levels not only to the whole Philippine Science High School community but to some visiting schools as well. Annual Interscholastic Competitions are held as well, while the fourth year students compete with each other in defending their year-long Science and Technology Research (STR) projects during the Research Fair.

Aside from the YMSAT Week, the school also annually holds Humanities Week in the month of August or September. During this week, students showcase their month-long rehearsed presentations for the annual Patimpalak sa Filipino. First year students showcase Kilos Awit, second year students present Sabayang Pagbigkas, third year students do non-conventional music, while fourth year students perform interpretative dances.

Notable alumni
 Atom Araullo (Batch 2000): newscaster, reporter, and television host
 Jose Y. Dalisay Jr. (Batch 1971-A): writer, editor, columnist, and Palanca awardee
 Bobby L. Castro: Co-Founder, President and CEO of Palawan Pawnshop-Palawan Express Pera Padala Group
 Angelita Maligalig-Castro: Co-Founder, Palawan Pawnshop-Palawan Express Pera Padala Group
 Auraeus Solito: filmmaker
 Ricardo Novenario: playwright
 Jillian Therese Robredo: youngest daughter of former Vice President Leni Robredo

Notes

References
 Dalisay, Butch. (2006). "Romancing the Gifted".
 Habito, Cielito. (2007). "A high-yield public investment", Inquirer Business.
 official website

Philippine Science High School System
Science high schools in Metro Manila
Public schools in Metro Manila
Schools in Quezon City
Educational institutions established in 1964
1964 establishments in the Philippines